Coram Boy is a 2000 children's novel by Jamila Gavin. It won Gavin a Whitbread Children's Book Award.

Stage adaptation

The book was adapted for the stage by Helen Edmundson, with music by Adrian Sutton, and played for two runs on the Olivier Stage at the National Theatre in 2005-2006 and 2006–2007, also having a brief Broadway production in 2007.

The play received a number of Tony Award, Drama Desk Award and Outer Critics Circle Award nominations, and a Theatre World Award for Xanthe Elbrick in 2007.
Coram Boy was nominated for four Olivier Awards in 2006: for Best New Play (Helen Edmundson), Best Director (Melly Still), Best Sound Design (Christopher Shutt), and Best Performance in a Supporting Role (Paul Ritter).

Coram Boy was re-staged in 2011 by Bristol Old Vic at Colston Hall, again directed by Melly Still, and featuring a cast, choir and orchestra from Bristol.

References

Costa Book Award-winning works
2000 British novels
British young adult novels
Children's historical novels
Novels about slavery
British novels adapted into plays
2000 children's books
Foundling Hospital